Fuego en el alma (Fire in the Soul) is a 2005 Puerto Rican film production. The film was produced by Amatista Films and the production company "Y Si Nos Gusta" that belonged to Julián Gil. It was directed by Abdiel Colberg.

Cast 
 Julián Gil - Millo
 Daniela Droz - Luisa, Millo's wife
 Braulio Castillo, Jr. - Raúl, lover and photoreporter
 Luisa de los Ríos
 Raúl Dávila - Jorge, Anhelo's husband 
 Rey Pascual
 Idalia Pérez Garay - Anhelo
 Néstor Rodulfo - Gabriel

Film locations 
The movie was recorded in Puerto Rico: Carolina, Isabela, San Juan and in New York City.

References

External links 
 

2005 films
Puerto Rican films
2000s Spanish-language films
Films set in Puerto Rico
Films shot in Puerto Rico